Dubno is a village and municipality in the Rimavská Sobota District of the Banská Bystrica Region of southern Slovakia.

History 
In historical records, the village was first mentioned in 1427 Tamas Recsky's (a noble) property.

Genealogical resources

The records for genealogical research are available at the state archive "Statny Archiv in Banska Bystrica, Slovakia"

 Roman Catholic church records (births/marriages/deaths): 1812-1897 (parish B)
 Reformated church records (births/marriages/deaths): 1769-1858 (parish B)

See also
 List of municipalities and towns in Slovakia

External links 
 https://web.archive.org/web/20071027094149/http://www.statistics.sk/mosmis/eng/run.html
 http://www.e-obce.sk/obec/dubno/dubno.html
 http://www.dubno.gemer.org/
 http://www.dubno.ou.sk/
Surnames of living people in Dubno

Villages and municipalities in Rimavská Sobota District